Synval Silva (Juiz de Fora, March 14, 1911 – Rio de Janeiro, April 14, 1994) was a singer and Brazilian composer. His main successes were recorded by Carmen Miranda.

References

External links
 
 Synval Silva at the Dicionário Cravo Albin da Música Popular Brasileira

1911 births
1994 deaths
Brazilian composers
People from Juiz de Fora
People from Minas Gerais
20th-century composers